The 1839 Georgia gubernatorial election was held on October 7, 1839.

The Democratic Candidate Charles McDonald won re-election defeating Whig Candidate Charles Dougherty, with the election being decided by 1,907 votes.

General election

Candidates

Democratic 

 Charles McDonald, Former Brigadier general.

Whig 

 Charles Dougherty, Lawyer

Results

References 

Georgia (U.S. state) gubernatorial elections
Georgia
Gubernatorial